Kryczka is a family name of Polish origin. Notable people with the surname include:

 Joe Kryczka (19351991), lawyer, judge, and president of the Canadian Amateur Hockey Association
 Karen Kryczka (born 1940), Canadian politician
 Kelly Kryczka (born 1961), Canadian Olympian

Polish-language surnames